Bolshoy Golovsky is a rural locality (a khutor) in Deminskoye Rural Settlement, Novoanninsky District, Volgograd Oblast, Russia. The population was 208 as of 2010. There are 2 streets.

Geography 
Bolshoy Golovsky is located in forest steppe on the Khopyorsko-Buzulukskaya Plain, 46 km northwest of Novoanninsky (the district's administrative centre) by road. Maly Dubovsky is the nearest rural locality.

References 

Rural localities in Novoanninsky District